The 2015 European Women Basketball Championship, commonly called EuroBasket Women 2015, was the 35th edition of the continental tournament in women's basketball, sanctioned by the FIBA Europe. The tournament was co-held in Hungary, which hosted the championship for the fifth time after 1950, 1964, 1983 and 1997, and Romania which hosted it for the second time after 1966, on 11–28 June 2015. The event was hosted by more than one country for the first time.

Serbia won their first title by defeating France 76–68 in the final.

Host selection
Initially six member federations expressed their intention to organize the tournament: Belarus and Lithuania, who applied a joint bid; Hungary, Israel, Serbia and Spain. Lithuania later refused the plan of a joint bid and eventually two countries submitted an official candidation, Belarus and Hungary.

The final decision was made by the FIBA Europe Board on 18 December 2011 in their meeting in Munich, which awarded the organization rights to Hungary by majority vote. FIBA Europe president Ólafur Rafnsson was on the opinion that "it was an excellent choice as Hungary has tradition in basketball and especially in women's basketball." Attila Czene, State Minister for Sport of the Ministry of National Resources was also pleased, stating that the European Championship great opportunity to upgrade and expand the infrastructure, as Hungary's aim "is to invest in sport and basketball is a main team sport." "As a former Olympic champion, I am happy that we can reintroduce team sport in Hungary. Basketball is a bit behind handball right now and we are trying to close this gap, with 2015 we can start making progress" – he added.

Romanian Basketball Federation has announced that FIBA Europe board has granted them the rights to co-host EuroBasket Women in 2015 with Hungary. Originally Hungary applied to host and was awarded the tournament as the only host country. According to the announcement current plan has Romania hosting groups in Cluj-Napoca, Oradea and Timișoara.

Venues

Qualification

The qualification was held from 7 June 2013 to 25 June 2014.

Qualified teams

Squads

Draw
The draw was held on 29 November 2014 in Budapest, Hungary.

Seedings
The seeding was announced on 20 November 2014. According to the FIBA Europe regulations the participating nations are seeded based on their record in EuroBasket Women 2013 final tournament (shown in brackets for first 6 teams) or EuroBasket Women 2015 qualification (shown in brackets with symbol Q).

First round

Group A

Group B

Group C

Group D

Second round

Group E

Group F

Final round

Final

Final ranking

Statistics and awards

Statistical leaders

Points

Rebounds

Assists

Blocks

Steals

Awards

References

External links
Official website

 
2015
EuroBasket Women
EuroBasket Women 2015
EuroBasket Women 2015
EuroBasket Women
EuroBasket Women
June 2015 sports events in Europe
2014–15 in Hungarian basketball
2014–15 in Romanian basketball
International sports competitions in Budapest
2010s in Budapest
Sport in Debrecen
Sport in Győr
Sport in Oradea
Sport in Sopron
Sport in Szombathely
Sport in Timișoara